Phanxicô Xaviê Nguyễn Văn Thuận or Francis-Xavier Nguyễn Văn Thuận (17 April 1928 – 16 September 2002), was a Vietnamese cardinal in the Catholic Church. He was a nephew of South Vietnam's first president, Ngô Đình Diệm, and of Archbishop Ngô Đình Thục.

Pope Francis named him as Venerable on 4 May 2017, a significant step on the road towards canonization.

Early life
Thuận was born in Huế in 1928, the son of Nguyễn Văn Ấm and Elizabeth Ngô Đình Thị Hiệp, daughter of Ngô Đình Khả. He joined the seminary at An Ninh as a teenager, and was ordained a priest on 11 June 1953, by Monsignor Jean-Baptiste Urrutia. After three years of further studies in Rome, he was appointed in 1959–1967 as a faculty member and rector of the Seminary of Hoan Thiện, Huế.

Episcopal career
He was appointed Bishop of Nha Trang on 13 April 1967 and received episcopal consecration on 4 June 1967 at Huế from Angelo Palmas, Apostolic Delegate to Viêt Nam (and later Nuncio to Colombia and to Canada), assisted by Bishops Philippe Nguyễn Kim Dien, Apostolic Administrator, sede plena, of Huế, and Jean-Baptiste Urrutia, titular archbishop of Carpato. On 24 April 1975, he was appointed Coadjutor Archbishop of Saigon. Six days later, Saigon fell to the North Vietnamese Army, and Thuận, targeted for his faith as well as his family connections to Ngô Đình Diệm, was detained by the communist government of Vietnam in a re-education camp for 13 years, nine in solitary confinement.

In prison, he smuggled out messages to his people on scraps of paper. The brief reflections, copied by hand and circulated within the Vietnamese community, have been printed in the book, The Road of Hope. Through a network of influential Overseas Vietnamese, including dignitaries, like his former classmate Monsignor Trần Văn Hoài, The Road of Hope was distributed worldwide. Another book, Prayers of Hope, contains his prayers written in prison. The bishop fashioned a tiny Bible out of scraps of paper. Sympathetic guards smuggled in a piece of wood and some wire from which he crafted a small crucifix.

In exile
On 21 November 1988, Thuận was released by the communist government but kept under house arrest in the archbishop's house in Hanoi, impeded from returning to his see, Hồ Chí Minh City. He was allowed to visit Rome in 1991 but not to return. The following year, he was given a post at the International Catholic Commission for Migration in Geneva, Switzerland. On 24 November 1994, he was appointed President of the Pontifical Council for Justice and Peace, and at the same time resigned from his post of Coadjutor Archbishop of Sai Gon. As President of the Pontifical Council, he handled issues such as Third World debt. In 1995, he was appointed Postulator of the Cause of Beatification of Brother Nguyễn Tan Văn, also known as Marcel Van. On 21 February 2001, Thuận was created a Cardinal Deacon of Santa Maria della Scala. He died of cancer in a clinic in Rome, Italy, on 16 September 2002, at the age of 74.

Legacy
On 16 September 2007, the fifth anniversary of the cardinal's death, the Catholic Church began the beatification process for Thuận.

Pope Benedict XVI expressed "profound joy" at news of the official opening of the beatification cause. Catholics in Vietnam also positively received the news on beatification process opening for the cardinal. In the words of a catechist from the Archdiocese of Hồ Chí Minh City, "Nguyễn Văn Thuận is an example of holiness for Vietnamese Catholics and for the entire world."

In his 2007 encyclical, Spe Salvi, Benedict XVI referred to Thuận's Prayers of Hope, saying:

During thirteen years in jail, in a situation of seemingly utter hopelessness, the fact that he could listen and speak to God became for him an increasing power of hope, which enabled him, after his release, to become for people all over the world a witness to hope—to that great hope which does not wane even in the nights of solitude.

Dr. Waldery Hilgeman is postulator of the cause for Thuận's canonization.

Writings
 François-Xavier Nguyễn Văn Thuận. Five Loaves & Two Fish 1969  
 François-Xavier Nguyễn Văn Thuận. The Road of Hope: A Gospel from Prison 2001  
 François-Xavier Nguyễn Văn Thuận. Prayers of Hope, Words of Courage 2002  
 François-Xavier Nguyễn Văn Thuận. Five Loaves & Two Fish 2003  
 François-Xavier Nguyễn Văn Thuận. Prières d'espérance 1995 
 François-Xavier Nguyễn Văn Thuận. J'ai suivi Jésus: un évêque témoigne 1997

Quotes

 Recorded on the Feast of the Holy Rosary, 7 October 1976, in Phú Khánh prison, during his solitary confinement: "I am happy here, in this cell, where white mushrooms are growing on my sleeping mat, because You are here with me, because You want me to live here with You. I have spoken much in my lifetime: now I speak no more. It's Your turn to speak to me, Jesus; I am listening to You".

See also
 Roman Catholicism in Vietnam

References

External links
 Cardinal Nguyễn Văn Thuận website
 Nguyễn Văn Thuận Foundation website
 My captors, my friends: Cardinal Nguyễn Văn Thuận, Catholic Weekly, 18 March 2001

1928 births
2002 deaths
21st-century venerated Christians
History of Catholicism in Vietnam
Ngo family
Deaths from cancer in Lazio
Vietnamese people of the Vietnam War
People from Huế
Vietnamese Servants of God
20th-century Roman Catholic bishops in Vietnam
Vietnamese cardinals
Vietnamese dissidents
Vietnamese exiles
Vietnamese refugees
Pontifical Council for Justice and Peace
Cardinals created by Pope John Paul II
Venerated Catholics by Pope Francis